</noinclude>

The American Association of Biological Anthropologists (AABA) is an international group based in the United States which affirms itself  as a  professional society of biological anthropologists. The organization publishes the American Journal of Biological Anthropology, a peer-reviewed science journal. It was formerly the American Association of Physical Anthropologists (AAPA), but changed its name after a series of votes between 2018 and 2020.

History 
The AAPA was first formed following a proposal by Czech-American anthropologist Aleš Hrdlička at the December 1928 New York meeting of Section H (Anthropology) of the American Association for the Advancement of Science (AAAS). Twenty anthropologists and anatomists voted in favor of the creation of an American Association of Physical Anthropologists, and an organizational committee of eight was formed (Fay Cooper Cole, Charles H. Danforth, George A. Dorsey, William K. Gregory, Earnest A. Hooton, Aleš Hrdlička, and Robert J. Terry). The first annual meeting of the AAPA was held in 1930 at the University of Virginia.

Name Change 
In 2018, at the 87th meeting of the AAPA in Austin, Texas, the Executive Committee stated its intention to hold a survey of AAPA members to assess their opinions on whether the AAPA should change its name, and what potential names could replace it. There were several motivations for the survey, including the fact that most academic departments, courses, and textbooks today use the term biological anthropology rather than physical anthropology, which evokes antiquated focuses of the discipline, such as racial typology. Moreover, most members of the AAPA self-identify as biological anthropologists, rather than physical anthropologists. The survey was administered online to AAPA members, and a majority voted in favor of changing the name, with the most popular name choice being American Association of Biological Anthropologists. A formal vote among Regular members with take place at the 2019 meeting, with a final vote at the 2020 meeting.

Membership 
There are over 2,200 members of the AABA. There are three categories of membership: Regular, Student, and Special (persons with a professional interest in biological anthropology who do not meet the requirements of regular membership). Members of the AABA can attend the annual meeting at a rate determined by their membership category, receive full access to AABA publications and electronic communications, and submit nominations for elected positions. Regular members may vote and serve in elected positions.

Annual Meeting 
The AABA holds an annual meeting that is attended by scientists from around the world. The 2019 meeting was held in Cleveland, Ohio.

Position Statements

Statements on Race & Racism 
A 2019 statement on race and racism by the AAPA declared, in part:Race does not provide an accurate representation of human biological variation. It was never accurate in the past, and it remains inaccurate when referencing contemporary human populations. Humans are not divided biologically into distinct continental types or racial genetic clusters. Instead, the Western concept of race must be understood as a classification system that emerged from, and in support of, European colonialism, oppression, and discrimination.This statement further emphasized that "No group of people is, or ever has been, biologically homogeneous or 'pure.' Furthermore, human populations are not — and never have been — biologically discrete, truly isolated, or fixed."

Previously, the AAPA had published an official position on biological aspects of race, based on evidence from anthropological (as well as biological, genetic, and social scientific) research in the American Journal of Physical Anthropology, vol. 101, pp 569–570, 1996. That statement emphasized that all humans belong to a single species and share common descent, that biological traits are influenced by both genetic and environmental factors, and genetic diversity exists within all human populations. This position was first drafted as a revision of the 1964 UNESCO statement on race, which itself was first created in 1950 in response to World War II and Nazism.

Scientific Creationism and the National Center for Science Education (NCSE) 
As written in 1982, in agreement with the AAAS, the AAPA condemns the teaching of scientific creationism at public expense.

AABA Code of Ethics 
The AABA has an official code of ethics emphasizing the importance of the well-being of the people and animals with which members work; informed consent; conservation of fossil, archaeological, and historical records; making data accessible and disseminating findings; teaching in a non-discriminatory fashion, and giving appropriate credit to all collaborators including students and trainees. The AAPA also issued an official statement on sexual harassment, outlining the definition, prevention, and reporting of sexual harassment and assault within the professional community as well as expectations for behavior among members.

References

External links 
 American Association of Physical Anthropologists

Scientific organizations based in the United States
Anthropology-related professional associations